"Hold Each Other" is a song by American pop duo A Great Big World, released as the lead single from their second studio album, When the Morning Comes. The song was released on July 22, 2015, through Epic Records and features vocals from American rapper Futuristic.

Music video
The song's accompanying music video premiered on September 16, 2015, through their Vevo channel.

Commercial performance
"Hold Each Other" debuted on the US Billboard Hot 100 chart at number 99 during the week of October 10, 2015, becoming A Great Big World's second Hot 100 entry and Futuristic's first. The song also debuted on the Canadian Hot 100 chart at number 69.

Charts

Weekly charts

Year-end charts

References

2015 singles
2015 songs
A Great Big World songs
Epic Records singles